The  are a Japanese professional baseball team based in Fukuoka, Fukuoka Prefecture. They compete in Nippon Professional Baseball (NPB) as a member of the Pacific League. The team subsequently became known as the Fukuoka Daiei Hawks until 2005, when they were purchased by SoftBank Group, becoming the Fukuoka SoftBank Hawks. Since 1993, the Hawks have played at the Fukuoka PayPay Dome, which has gone under several name changes and seats 40,000 people.

The Hawks are often regarded as one of the most successful franchises in Pacific League and the richest in all of baseball under the ownership of SoftBank Group, with the second most wins in all of Japanese sports, only trailing the Yomiuri Giants. The Hawks have played in the Japan Series 20 different times. The club also won two Japanese Baseball League championships in 1946 and 1948 while the team was based in Osaka.

The drought finally ended in 1999, with gradual additions over the previous five years under new manager and home run king Sadaharu Oh.

Through 2022, the franchise's all-time record is 5545-4931-399 (.529).

History

Nankai Electric Railway Company ownership (1938–1988) 
The franchise that eventually became the Fukuoka SoftBank Hawks was founded on February 22, 1938 by Nankai Electric Railway president Jinkichi Terada as Nankai Club, based in central Osaka. The organization was said to be created as a result of rival railway companies Hanshin Electric Railway and Hankyu convincing Nankai to create a baseball club of their own. While initially met with resistance, the club was admitted to the Japanese Baseball League (JPBL) in the fall of 1938, playing their first games at Sakai Ohama Stadium, but moved into Nakamozu Stadium in 1939. The team's name was changed to Kinki Nippon in mid-1944 as wartime austerity measures forced Nankai to temporarily merge with Kinki Nippon Railway. After the 1945 hiatus in the JBL due to the Greater East Asia War, in 1946 the team's name was changed to Kinki Great Ring and the team won the JBL championship.

In mid-1947, when Nankai broke away from Kinki Nippon Railway, they decided to change the team's name, and settled upon the moniker they would use until they would sell the team in 1988 – . The team was named after Nankai's logo, which, at that time, was a winged wheel. Other names considered were Condors, which was rejected because the Nankai representative who supervised the team was bald, and Cardinals, which was rejected because the club wanted to retain their colors, so they settled on the Hawks moniker.

Under player-manager Kazuto Tsuruoka (known as Kazuto Yamamoto from 1946 to 1958) they became one of the most successful franchises through the first two decades of the Pacific League's existence, taking two Japan Series championships in 1959 and 1964, as well as 10 Pacific League pennants. Kazuto managed the team from 1946 to 1968, becoming the full-time manager after his retirement as a player in 1952.

In 1964, the Hawks team sent pitching prospect Masanori Murakami and two other young players to the San Francisco Giants single-A affiliate in Fresno as a baseball "exchange student". On September 1 of that year, Murakami became the first Japanese player to play in Major League Baseball  when he appeared on the mound for the San Francisco Giants at Shea Stadium against the New York Mets. In his debut, Murakami pitched one inning, allowing one hit and facing four batters in a 1-4 loss for the Giants. Murakami returned to the Hawks in 1966, playing for them through 1974. He contributed to the team's 1973 Japan Series appearance, their last under Nankai's ownership.

The team fell on hard times between 1978 and 1988, finishing no better than 4th place out of the 6 teams in the Pacific League in any year in the period. The team witnessed its fan base diminish as a result of the prolonged period of poor play, with attendance dropping and the club dealing with reduced profits.

The change in the club's financial performance led Nankai Electric Railway to question the value of maintaining ownership, even after considering the value the team represented as an advertising tool. The company's board of directors and union leadership put pressure on Den Kawakatsu, then-president of Nankai Railway and primary owner of the team, to sell the team, which he refused to do. However, Kawakatsu, who represented the most ardent supporter of Nankai's ownership of the Hawks, died on April 23, 1988, and the team was sold to the Daiei Corporation to become the Fukuoka Daiei Hawks after the 1988 season.

Katsuya Nomura, Mutsuo Minagawa, Hiromitsu Kadota, and Chusuke Kizuka are among the more notable franchise players that were active during the Nankai era.

Fukuoka Daiei Hawks (1988–2004) 
After the franchise was acquired by department store chain Daiei, Inc., the Hawks were moved to Fukuoka for two reasons; the first being the fact that the city had gone a decade without a team in the area, as the Crown Lighter Lions moved to Tokorozawa to become the Seibu Lions in 1978, and the second was that Daiei was looking to expand their reach as a brand to Kyushu, which Daiei had little to no presence in before the acquisition. As a result, they were no longer competing with the Hanshin Tigers, Kintetsu Buffaloes or even the by-then rechristened Orix Braves (later the Orix Blue Wave, now the Orix Buffaloes) for a market share of the Greater Osaka metropolitan area. However, in spite of those efforts of the new ownership, the Hawks still were usually in the cellar of the Pacific League, and continued to be at the bottom half of the league until 1997. The Hawks would play their first four seasons at the Lions' old stadium, Heiwadai Stadium.

In 1993, the Hawks moved out of Heiwadai Stadium and into the newly constructed Fukuoka Dome, located 2.2 kilometers northwest of Heiwadai. Heiwadai Stadium would later be closed in November 1997 and fully demolished by 2008. The Fukuoka Dome would be the first retractable roof stadium in NPB and the only retractable roof stadium until 2023, when ES CON Field Hokkaido opened. However, due to inefficient design and high operating costs, the roof is almost never opened. Since the Hawks moved to the Fukuoka Dome, they have led Pacific League in annual average attendance every single year except for 2021, where pandemic restrictions in Japan prevented them from reaching said goal.

The Hawks front office adopted a strategy of drafting and developing younger players, supplemented by free agent signings, a policy overseen by team president Ryuzo Setoyama and his aides. Setoyama's most brilliant moves were the hiring of home run king Sadaharu Oh in 1995 to take the reins of manager, a title he would hold until 2008 before he moved into the general manager's position. As of 2022, Oh is still with the Hawks organization as a chairman of the Hawks' board of directors, and still engages with day-to-day operations of the team at the age of 82. Oh replaced then-manager Rikuo Nemoto, who was named team president and held that position until his death in 1999.  Also tapped was Akira Ishikawa, a little-known former player, who was tasked with bringing in talented amateurs. He brought in the likes of former Hanshin Tigers catcher Kenji Johjima, Kazumi Saitoh, Nobuhiko Matsunaka, future Chicago White Sox and Chiba Lotte Marines infielder Tadahito Iguchi, shortstop Munenori Kawasaki, and future team captain Hiroki Kokubo.

Supplementing the amateur signings were some key free-agent acquisitions. Daiei went toe to toe with the then richest man in Japan, Yoshiaki Tsutsumi, to pull former Seibu stars from their 1980s championship teams to Fukuoka. Among them were infielder Hiromichi Ishige, immensely popular outfielder (and Hawks manager from 2008 to 2014, replacing Oh in that capacity) Koji Akiyama, and ace left-handed pitcher and former manager Kimiyasu Kudoh.

These moves, alongside a few unpopular cost-cutting measures, helped to make the Hawks gradually more competitive with each passing year, and in 1999, the team finally broke through. That season, Daiei made their first Japan Series appearance since 1973 (and first as a Fukuoka team), and defeated the Chunichi Dragons in five games, giving them their first championship since 1964. Kudoh was dominant in his Game 1 start (complete game, 13 strikeouts), and Akiyama was named the 1999 Japan Series's most valuable player.

The following year, the Hawks again made the Japan Series, but this time lost to the powerful Yomiuri Giants in six games. Despite the shaky financial ground that Daiei was on thanks to their rampant expansion in bubble-era Japan, the team continued to be competitive. The team won their second Japan Series in five years, defeating the popular Hanshin Tigers in seven games in the 2003 Japan Series, a series in which the home team won every game.

Home run record controversy 
In , American Karl "Tuffy" Rhodes, playing for the Osaka Kintetsu Buffaloes, hit 55 home runs with several games left, equaling Hawks' manager Sadaharu Oh's single-season home run record.  The Buffaloes played a weekend series against the Oh-managed Hawks late in the season, after already clinching the pennant on a walk-off grand slam against the Orix BlueWave on September 26. Rhodes was intentionally walked during each at-bat of the series.  Video footage showed Hawks' catcher Kenji Johjima grinning as he caught the intentional balls. Oh denied any involvement and Hawks battery coach Yoshiharu Wakana stated that the pitchers acted on his orders, saying, "It would be distasteful to see a foreign player break Oh's record." Rhodes completed the season with 55 home runs.  League commissioner Hiromori Kawashima denounced the Hawks' behavior as "unsportsmanlike", and Wakana would be fired from the position as a result. Hawks pitcher Keisaburo Tanoue went on record saying that he wanted to throw strikes to Rhodes, but didn't want to disrespect the orders of his catcher.

In , Venezuelan Alex Cabrera hit 55 home runs with five games left in the season, with several of those to be played against Oh's Hawks. Oh told his pitchers to throw strikes to Cabrera, but most of them ignored his order and threw balls well away from the plate. After the game, Oh stated, "If you're going to break the record, you should do it by more than one. Do it by a lot."  In the wake of the most recent incident involving Cabrera, ESPN listed Oh's single-season home run record as #2 on its list of "The Phoniest Records in Sports".

In , Swallows infielder Munetaka Murakami broke Oh's record for the most home runs in a single season by a Japanese-born player, hitting 56 home runs in the regular season.

Fukuoka SoftBank Hawks (2005–present) 
Daiei had been under financial pressure to sell its stake in the team over the previous few years, with reports in 2003 suggesting the company would sell the team and the Fukuoka Dome. After filing for a bankruptcy reorganization provision in 2004, Daiei attempted to hold on to the team and held discussions with its primary lenders, including UFJ Bank, to see if it could find a way to retain the team, but ultimately the sale went through to SoftBank Group on January 28, 2005. SoftBank had been interested in owning a baseball team since 2002 and agreed to purchase all 14,432,000 of Daiei's shares in the team, which accounted for 98% of team ownership, for 15 billion yen. This deal did not include the Fukuoka Dome, which was later sold to an affiliate of the GIC. SoftBank decided to lease the rights to the Fukuoka Dome for 4.8 billion yen per year for 20 years. They would end up purchasing the stadium from the GIC affiliate for 87 billion yen in March 2012, with the stadium being fully owned by the Fukuoka SoftBank Hawks Marketing Corporation by July 1, 2015.

The Hawks continued their winning ways after the sale of the team to SoftBank. Following the sale, the Hawks represented one of the richest teams in Japan, with a player core still intact from the last years of the Daiei era. Particularly strong was the team's starting pitching behind Saitoh, Tsuyoshi Wada, Nagisa Arakaki, and Toshiya Sugiuchi.  In 2005, the Hawks finished in first place during the regular season, but fell to the eventual Japan Series champions, the Chiba Lotte Marines in the second stage of the Climax Series.  In 2006, a dramatic pennant race led to an even more exciting playoff run that ended in the Sapporo Dome at the hands of the eventual Japan Series Champions, the Hokkaido Nippon Ham Fighters.  Team manager Sadaharu Oh missed most of the 2006 season due to stomach cancer.

The Hawks'  was plagued by injuries and general ineffectiveness and inconsistency, leading to another 3rd-place finish and first-stage exit in the playoffs at the hands of the Marines. In , though various injuries still affected the Hawks' bench (especially the bullpen), the club claimed its first Interleague title in June, winning a tiebreaker against the Hanshin Tigers. However, injuries caught up with them in the final month of the season, and the Hawks finished in last place with a 54–74–2 record.  The finish represented their worst since 1996. Oh announced his transfer to a front office role at the end of the season, as former Hawk and fan favorite Koji Akiyama was named as his successor.

In , the team cracked the playoffs once again on the backs of breakout seasons from surging starting pitcher D. J. Houlton, outfielder Yuya Hasegawa, Rookie of the Year Tadashi Settsu and another stellar season from ace Sugiuchi.  However, the team still was unable to get out of the first stage, as the Tohoku Rakuten Golden Eagles ousted the Hawks in a 2-game sweep.

Team of the 2010s 
The Hawks finally reclaimed the Pacific League regular season title in 2010 after a seven-year wait. The title came after a see-saw season in which the team recovered several times after extended losing streaks. Starting pitcher Wada, back from injury through much of the previous two seasons, was, along with fellow ace Sugiuchi, at his best. Wada set career highs in wins and games started.  The reliable "SBM" relieving trio of Settsu, Brian Falkenborg, and Mahara limited opponent offenses late in games.  The bullpen also benefited from the emergence of Keisuke Kattoh and Masahiko Morifuku, with the latter blossoming in the second half of the season.

The Hawks offense was largely composed of role players who seemed to take turns having big games and off days, and it was the team's speed that drove the team as the Hawks led the league in stolen bases in the regular season with 148, well ahead of their nearest challenger, who had 116. Yuichi Honda and Kawasaki combined to steal 89 bases.  However, despite putting forward a strong group, the Hawks failed to make it to the Japan Series, losing to the Chiba Lotte Marines in six games in the Climax Series despite having a 3–1 series lead.

SoftBank won the Pacific League again in 2011, with a dominating season on all fronts.  The offense was bolstered further by the acquisition of former Yokohama BayStars outfielder Seiichi Uchikawa, who led the league in batting in 2011. Pitching from Sugiuchi, Wada and an excellent bounce-back season from Houlton also helped propel the team to the best record in NPB.  After sweeping the Saitama Seibu Lions in the Pacific League Climax Series, the Hawks took on the Chunichi Dragons to win the Japan Series, a rematch of the 1999 Japan Series.  The Dragons pushed SoftBank to the full seven games, but the Hawks shut out the Dragons 3–0 in the seventh game to win their first Japan Series since 2003.

The 2012 season started with losses for the Hawks. During the off season, they lost their star starters Tsuyoshi Wada (to the Baltimore Orioles), Toshiya Sugiuchi and D.J. Houlton (to Yomiuri Giants) through free agency. All star shortstop Munenori Kawasaki also left the team for the Seattle Mariners. Closer Takahiro Mahara would sit out the season through injury. To compensate for these losses, the team acquired outfielder Wily Mo Peña and starter Brad Penny from MLB, in addition to starter Kazuyuki Hoashi from the Lions. However, of the 3 major signings, only  Peña made regular contributions. Hoashi and Penny made two starts combined in 2012, as Hoashi missed almost the entire season with an injury and Penny was released.

The team had to deal with their off season losses to their pitching staff from within the organization. Settsu was elevated to the team's ace, while young pitchers such as Kenji Otonari and Hiroki Yamada were given bigger roles. Nagisa Arakaki returned from long-term injury to join the rotation.  However, new closer Falkenborg had to sit out most of the season through injury, eventually handing over the role to Morifuku. Arakaki could not regain his former numbers. In the end, the losses could not be mitigated. Despite a tailspin to end the season, the Hawks snuck into the Climax Series, finishing 3rd in the Pacific League regular season standings, one game over the Tohoku Rakuten Golden Eagles, but eventually lost out to the pennant-winning Hokkaido Nippon-Ham Fighters in the P.L. Climax Series Final Stage. The bright spark of the season came from rookie starter Shota Takeda, who went 8–1 with an ERA of 1.07.

In 2014 the Hawks won the Japan Series in five games over the Hanshin Tigers. Manager Koji Akiyama retired after the season, and the team named his former teammate Kimiyasu Kudo to succeed him.  Under Kudoh's stewardship, SoftBank won for a second consecutive season in 2015 again in five games, this time over the Tokyo Yakult Swallows. Outfielder Yuki Yanagita won Pacific League MVP, the batting title, and a Triple 3 (.300 BA, 30 HR, 30 SB or better in all 3 categories). It marked the first time since the Seibu Lions won three in a row from 1990 to 1992 that a team had won consecutive Japan Series championships.

After falling to Shohei Ohtani and the Fighters in 2016, the Hawks rebounded to win the 2017 Japan Series on the back of a dominating 94-49-0 season, their best season since  in terms of winning percentage and their first 90 win season since , in six games over the Yokohama DeNA BayStars, in a series where the Hawks led 3–0, but were almost pushed to a seventh game.
The following year the Hawks also won the 2018 Japan Series against the Hiroshima Toyo Carp in six games, making it back to back titles for a second time, and four out of the last five; the next year, they became the first team to win three straight Japan Series titles since the Seibu Lions did it from 1990 to 1992, by sweeping the Yomiuri Giants. Pitcher Kodai Senga would blossom into the team's ace over their run of six championships in seven seasons, as he also threw the team's first no-hitter since 1943 on September 6, 2019, against the Chiba Lotte Marines.

2020s 
In , the Hawks won the 2020 Japan Series, again in a four game sweep over the Yomiuri Giants, becoming the first team to win more than three consecutive Japan Series titles since the Yomiuri Giants won the last of nine consecutive titles in 1973. They also became the first team in NPB history to sweep two Japan Series against the same opponent in back-to-back seasons. Most notably, Matt Moore pitched seven no-hit innings in Game 3 of that Japan Series as the Hawks came within one out of the first combined no-hitter in Japan Series play since Daisuke Yamai and Hitoki Iwase threw a combined perfect game for the Chunichi Dragons to end the 2007 Japan Series.

The Hawks ended an injury-riddled and underwhelming  with a 60-62-21 record, finishing 4th in the Pacific League, the first time the team had not qualified for the playoffs since 2013. This also was the first time since 2008 that the Hawks failed to maintain a .500 winning percentage season, as manager Kimiyasu Kudo stepped down after the conclusion of the 2021 season.

Yuki Yanagita was named team captain by Fujimoto, becoming the first team captain since Seiichi Uchikawa gave up the role after the  season. The Hawks went on a tear to begin the season, winning eight straight games, with Fujimoto being the first new manager to win seven consecutive games, and the first time since 1955 that the Hawks won eight straight games to open the season. A solid spring, including a Maddux no-hitter by Nao Higashihama on May 12 against the Saitama Seibu Lions, followed by a less than ideal summer filled with ups and downs, including going 1-9 in their annual Hawk Festival series and being the first team since the  Seibu Lions to be no-hit by the Hokkaido Nippon-Ham Fighters, led to the Hawks losing the pennant race to the Orix Buffaloes via tiebreaker after the Hawks lost to the Chiba Lotte Marines on the final day of the season, with both teams finishing with a record of 76-65-2. This marked the first time the top two teams in a league shared the exact same record in NPB history at the conclusion of the regular season, resulting in a tiebreaker being necessary. The Hawks lost the overall regular season series against Orix, as the Buffaloes won 15 games against them in comparison to SoftBank's 10 wins, resulting in Orix taking the 2022 Pacific League pennant. They would eventually fall to the Buffaloes in the second stage of the Climax Series, breaking an eighteen game playoff winning streak in the process.

On October 10, 2022, the Hawks announced the formation of a yon-gun squad (third farm team), becoming the first team in NPB to begin operations on a third farm team, beginning play in 2023.

Roster

Former players

Hawks former players

Retired numbers 
none

Honored numbers 

Sadaharu Oh's 89 was originally planned to be retired or honored after his retirement, but Oh made clear his preference to give the number to his successor.  Ultimately, however, the man who replaced him as manager of the Hawks, Akiyama, declined to wear the number on the grounds that the honor of bearing it would be too great so shortly after Oh's departure.  Instead, Akiyama wore the number 81.

Managers 

 Statistics current through the end of the  season.

Mascots 
The Fukuoka SoftBank Hawks have the largest number of mascots in NPB, with a total of eleven active mascots. Nine of them are traditional mascots that are a part of the Hawk Family. The currently known family members since 1992 are as follows:
Harry Hawk – a 23 year old yellow hawk with an orange beak wearing the number 100, Harry supports the team as the main mascot. He is the youngest brother of Homer Hawk, the former main mascot when the team was owned by Daiei. Harry is the only one with a Twitter account.
Honey Hawk – an 18 year old pink female hawk. Honey is Harry's girlfriend and the namesake of the Honeys, the Hawks' dancing and cheerleading squad.
Herculy Hawk – a 23 year old brown hawk wearing the number 200, Herculy is Harry's teammate as well as his longstanding rival since Hawk University days. Herculy is only seen wearing the team's away jersey, even at home and during special events, such as Hawks Festival or Fight! Kyushu days.
Honky Hawk – a 57 year old brown hawk, Honky is Harry's uncle, and the mayor of Hawks Town. He loves baseball and wears a brown fedora.
Helen Hawk – a 55 year old female hawk, Helen is Honky's wife. They had eloped during their high school days.
Hack Hawk – Harry's 7 year old nephew and the oldest brother of Hock and Rick. Hack wears red-lined T-shirt and the same color cap.
Rick Hawk – Harry's 5 year old nephew and middle of Hawk brothers. Rick wears glasses and blue-lined T-shirt and the same color cap.
Hock Hawk – Harry's 3 year old nephew and youngest brother of Hack and Rick. Hock wears a green-lined T-shirt and the same color cap.
Homer Hawk – The original mascot of the Hawks from 1989 to 2004 and the older brother of the team's current mascot Harry.
The Hawks also have 2 VTuber avatar mascots, named Takamine Umi and Aritaka Hina. Unveiled on November 9th, 2020, they have their own YouTube channel as well as their own Twitter profiles. They also make appearances on the PayPay Dome's video board.

Temporarily in 2020, the Hawks had 10 Spot robots from Boston Dynamics (at the time SoftBank owned Boston Dynamics) and 10 Pepper robots from SoftBank Robotics to replace the fans during a game against the Eagles due to COVID-19 restrictions in NPB games. They were still used when 5,000 fans were allowed in NPB games as fans were still not allowed to sing or use their voices to make noises, only through clapping or cheering batons.

The Hawks are the only other team, aside from the Fighters, to have a mascot primarily for their second team, and are the only team with one in the Western League (the Fighters' ni-gun team plays out of the Eastern League), in a chick named Hinamaru. He wears the team's cap, and has an eggshell that looks like a baseball.

The Hawks also have a mascot named Fu-san, who is based on a jet balloon that fans launch during the Lucky 7, prior to when the Hawks are up to bat in the 7th inning.

MLB players 
Retired: 
Masanori Murakami (1964–1965)
Tadahito Iguchi (2005–2008)
Kenji Johjima (2006–2009) 
Munenori Kawasaki (2012–2016) 
Tsuyoshi Wada (2014-2015)

Active:
Kodai Senga (2023-present)

Notes

External links 
Fukuoka SoftBank Hawks official web site 
Fukuoka SoftBank Hawks – NPB official web site

 
Baseball teams established in 1938
Nippon Professional Baseball teams
SoftBank Group
Sports teams in Fukuoka, Fukuoka
1938 establishments in Japan